The Potting Shed is a 1957 play by Graham Greene in three acts. The psychological drama centers on a secret held by the Callifer family for nearly thirty years.

The patriarch of the family is dying and James, his estranged son, appears unexpectedly. He can remember nothing about a mysterious moment that occurred in the family's potting shed when he was age 14. Family members who recall the event are unwilling to describe it to him. With the help of a psychoanalyst, James tries to recall just what happened that day that left him rejected by his father, alienated from his family, and alone in the world.

Characters
 Dr Frederick Baston, an old friend and fellow worker of H.C. Callifer, age early 60s
 Anne Callifer, daughter of John Callifer, age 13
 Sara Callifer, former wife of James Callifer, ageabout 36
 Mrs. Callifer, H.C. Callifer's wife. Mother of John and James, age about 70
 John Callifer, the father of Anne, age about 48
 James Callifer, the ex-husband of Sara, brother of John, age about 44
 Dr. Kreuzer, age between 50 and 60
 Corner, James Callifer's fellow lodger, age about 30
 Mrs. Potter, wife of former gardener, age about 75
 Miss Connolly, housekeeper to Father William Callifer, age about 55
 Father William Callifer, Uncle of John and James, and brother of H.C. Callifer, age about 60

Theatre productions
The Broadway production was directed by Carmen Capalbo. It opened on 29 January 1957 at the Bijou Theatre and later moved to the John Golden Theatre to complete its run of 143 performances. Robert Flemyng starred as James Callifer and Sybil Thorndike, Frank Conroy, Leueen MacGrath, Joan Croydon, Lewis Casson, and Carol Lynley were cast in supporting roles.
 
The Potting Shed was first produced in London on 5 February 1958 at the Globe Theatre, directed by Michael Macowan, starring; Walter Hudd, Sarah Long, Lockwood West, John Gielgud, Peter Illing, Redmond Phillips.

The third act of the play differed between the 1957 American and 1958 British productions. An author's note in the British edition of the published play (William Heinemann, 1958) states:

The Potting Shed was produced in New York in 1957 with a different third act which appears in the American edition of the play. For the English production, we have reverted to the last act as it was originally written and this is the only version authorised for Great Britain.

Greene never was pleased with the third act and rewrote it during rehearsals of the American production; he changed it back to the original script for the British premiere.

Time wrote "The play's emotional power derives from its harassed outcries and silences, from very human bafflements and needs, from a truly serious man's intensities and jocosities alike...for two acts, culminating in a superbly dramatic revelation scene, The Potting Shed, by its writing and storytelling alike, more and more grips and stirs its audience."

It was revived at the Finborough Theatre in early 2011.

Awards and nominations
 Tony Award for Best Play (nominee)
 Tony Award for Best Actress in a Play (Sybil Thorndike, nominee)
 Tony Award for Best Featured Actor in a Play (Frank Conroy, winner)
 Theatre World Award (Carol Lynley, winner)

Screen adaptations
In 1961, Paul Bogart directed the play for the television series The Play of the Week. Frank Conroy reprised his Broadway role. The cast included John Baragrey as James Callifer and Ludwig Donath, Ann Harding, Fritz Weaver, and Nancy Wickwire in supporting roles. 
 
A 1981 television production of the play was written by Pat Sandys and produced by Yorkshire Television for the London Weekend Television series Celebrity Playhouse. The cast, directed by David Cunliffe, included Paul Scofield as James Callifer and Anna Massey, Maurice Denham, Celia Johnson, David Swift, Allan Cuthbertson, and Cyril Luckham.

References

External links
Internet Broadway Database entry
Time review
1961 Play of the Week production
1981 Celebrity Playhouse production

1957 plays
Broadway plays
American television films
British television films
American films based on plays
Films based on works by Graham Greene
Plays by Graham Greene
American psychological drama films